Fethiyespor is a Turkish sports club based in Fethiye, Muğla.

Fethiyespor were promoted to the Turkish Second Division in the 2005–06 season. In the 2011–12 football season, Fethiyespor reached the end of season promotion play-off games but lost their final match.

Fethiyespor were promoted to TFF League One after play-off games which concluded on 31 May 2013.

On 4 December 2013, Fethiyespor recorded perhaps the best result in their history when they knocked Fenerbahçe out of the Turkish Cup at Fenerbahçe's Şükrü Saracoğlu Stadium. Fenerbahçe were at the time were comfortable leaders of the Süper Lig. Onur Okan’s header in the 77th minute, followed by a powerful shot from the same player six minutes later, was enough to shock the hosts with a 1–2 scoreline.

League participations 
 TFF First League: 1995–1996, 2013–2014
 TFF Second League: 2006–2013, 2014–2019, 2022–
 TFF Third League: 1984–1995, 1996–2006, 2019–2022
 Turkish Amateur League: 1933–1984

Current squad

Other players under contract

Out on loan

References

External links
Official website
Fethiyespor on TFF.org

 
Sport in Muğla Province
Football clubs in Turkey
Association football clubs established in 1933
1933 establishments in Turkey